Stauroteuthis is a genus of deepwater octopus, a cephalopod mollusk. This is the only genus in the family Stauroteuthidae, and only two species have been described in this genus.

They do not possess a radula.

The stauroteuthids have the distinction of being one of the few bioluminescent octopuses; some of the muscle cells that control the suckers in most species have been replaced with photophores which are believed to fool prey by directing them towards the mouth.

Species
 Stauroteuthis gilchristi is only known from two localities in the south Atlantic; these two localities may even represent different species.
 Stauroteuthis syrtensis is widespread in the North Atlantic.  The population size of S. syrtensis is unknown.

References

External links
Tree of Life website gives information about the classification of cephalopod groups
Stauroteuthidae discussion forum at TONMO.com

Octopuses
Taxa named by Addison Emery Verrill